The Agatdal Formation is a geologic formation in Greenland. It preserves fossils dating back to the Paleogene period.

See also

 List of fossiliferous stratigraphic units in Greenland

References
 

Paleogene Greenland